FK Bregalnica Štip is a football club based in Štip, North Macedonia. They are currently competing in the Macedonian First League.

History
FK Bregalnica was formed in 1921 and currently plays in the Macedonian First League. Their nickname is The Blues because the club colours are all blue. They play their games at Ground Bregalnica Arena Shtip with Capacity of 4,000 sits. The club's most successful years were those between 1964 and 1984 when the club was champion of Macedonian Republic League for 4 times and won the Macedonian cup in 1981 (these were regional Yugoslav competitions back then). The good times did not last however, the next few years saw the decline of FK Bregalnica, distinguished by the loss of star players. With the arrival of the new sponsor Kit-Go Bregalnica plan to play European football in the next 2 seasons with predominantly homegrown players.

Supporters
FK Bregalnica Štip supporters are called Falanga.

Honours
Macedonian Republic League:
Winners (4): 1964, 1967, 1976, 1984
Macedonian Republic Cup:
Winners (1): 1981
Macedonian Second League:
Winners (2): 1995–96, 2003–04, 2020–21

Recent seasons

1Bregalnica was withdrawn from the league after 18th round. Their matches from 14th round onwards were annulled.

2The 2019–20 season was abandoned due to the COVID-19 pandemic in North Macedonia.

Current squad
As of 14 January 2022.

Youth squad
Players from the Youth Team that have been summoned with the frist team in the current season.

Historical list of coaches

 Vladimir Beara
 Vlatko Kostov (1 Jul 2003 - Feb 2005)
 Gordan Zdravkov (27 Feb 2005 - Jun 2005)
 Nikola Spasov (Jul 2005 - Dec 2005)
 Kiril Dojčinovski (15 Dec 2005 - Sep 2006)
 Sase Stefanov (1 Oct 2006 - Dec 2006)
 Dragan Hristovski (8 Dec 2006 - Jun 2010)
 Nikola Kuzmanov (Jul 2010 – Feb 2011)
 Dragan Hristovski (25 Feb 2011 - Jun 2011)
 Ilija Mitrov (2011)
 Nikola Spasov (30 Jul 2011 - 19 Oct 2011)
 Vlatko Davitkov (caretaker) (19 Oct 2011 - 27 Oct 2011)
 Trajče Senev (27 Oct 2011 – 30 Jun 2012)
 Nikola Spasov (1 Jul 2012 - Jan 2013)
 Dobrinko Ilievski (3 Feb 2013 - 20 Dec 2013)
 Ali Güneş (23 Dec 2013 – 30 Jun 2014)
 Gjore Jovanovski (1 Jul 2014 - 4 Nov 2014)
 Dragan Hristovski (interim) (4 Nov 2014 - Dec 2014)
 Nikola Spasov (4 Nov 2014 - Dec 2014)
 Vlatko Kostov (4 Jan 2015 - 29 Aug 2015)
 Igor Stojanov (30 Aug 2015 - 14 Sep 2015)
 Toni Jakimovski (15 Sep 2015 – 8 Mar 2016)
 Igor Stojanov (9 Mar 2016 - 30 Aug 2016)
 Yüksel Yeşilova (31 Aug 2016 - 3 Nov 2016)
 Zdravko Cvetanoski (3 Nov 2016 – 14 Mar 2017)
 Nikola Kuzmanov (14 Mar 2017 – Nov 2017)
 Emil Grnev (Dec 2017 - 30 Sep 2018)
 Zoran Shterjovski (Oct 2018 - 2019)
 Dobrinko Ilievski (Jul 2019-2020)
 Marjan Sekulovski (Nov 2020-2021)
 Ilčo Gjorgioski (Jan 2022-)

References

External links
Official website 
Club info at MacedonianFootball 
Football Federation of Macedonia 

 
Football clubs in North Macedonia
Association football clubs established in 1921
Football clubs in Yugoslavia
1921 establishments in Yugoslavia